We Girls, also stylized WeGirls, was a South Korean girl group formed by Aftermoon Entertainment in Seoul, South Korea. The group debuted on August 31, 2018 with On Air. The group disbanded in early 2022 following over a year of inactivity.

History

Formation
We Girls were announced through a crowdfunding website called Makestar on October 31, 2017. The Makestar participants were able to vote on which of the girls would be the leader of the group. The initial lineup consisted of nine members: Jaina, Hyeni, Yehana, Woori, Vivian, Julie, Hal Park, Lina, & Suha.

In 2017 and 2018, the group went through several lineup changes as Jaina, Woori, Vivian, Julie, Lina, and Suha left the group. A new member Cindy was added, but she also left the group. New members E.You, EunA, Ellie, JungA, & Nina were added, bringing the total number of members to six.

Debut and member changes
We Girls debuted on August 31, 2018 with the extended play On Air, consisting of three tracks" We Go", "On Air" and "SelfieGram". The mini-album was produced by House Rulez. The album reached 43 on the Gaon chart. On October 9, they released a single called "Girls Wings Fly", which was a version of "On Air" for their fan group Wings.

In February of 2019 Hal announced her departure from the group to focus on acting, while Hyeni left the group in June of that year without giving a reason as to why, on October 2019 the group released their second EP Ride.

The group promoted their EP at KSTAGEO in Tokyo from November 2–4.  

In December of 2019, it was announced that EunA had also left the group.

Members changes and disbandment
On July 13, 2020, We Girls announced on their Instagram that Ellie and Nina had left the group after their contracts had expired, and they were looking for new members. Soon afterwards they announced the new members via their initials - "D", then "A", "Y", "S", "R", and lastly "K". "K" was revealed to be former Bulldok member Kimi, and "D" was Do Hayoon. "Y" and "R" were revealed as Yerim and Rhai, but no information about these members was given beyond their names, while "A" and "S" were never officially announced. Former Midnight member Byeoljji was also revealed to be joining the group.

Shortly afterwards, the group's social media largely went silent, with their only posts being about Yehana's solo debut in 2021.

In March of 2022, Yehana confirmed to fans via her Instagram that the group had disbanded.

Members
Final line-up
Yehana (예하나)
Han JungA (한정아)
Kimi (라이) 
Byeoljji (별찌) 
Do Hayoon (도하윤)
Rhai (라이)
Yerim (예림)

Former members
Ellie (엘리)
Nina (니나)
HaL (하엘)
Hyeni (혜니)
EunA (은아)
E.You (이유)

Timeline

Discography

Extended plays

Singles 
 "On Air" (2018)
 "Girls Wings Fly" (2018)
"Ride" (2019)

Awards

KY Star Awards

References

K-pop music groups
South Korean girl groups
South Korean dance music groups
Musical groups from Seoul
Musical groups established in 2018
2018 establishments in South Korea
South Korean pop music groups
2022 disestablishments in South Korea